Moren is an Irish surname, which first originated from County Mayo, Republic of Ireland. The original Gaelic form of the name Moren is O Morain or O Moghrain, this is derived from the word "mor" which means "big." Notable people with the surname include:
Lew Moren, baseball pitcher
Peter Morén, member of Swedish band Peter Bjorn and John
Peter Morén (drummer), heavy metal drummer
 Teri Moren (born 1969), American basketball coach
Valtteri Moren, Finnish footballer

See also
 
 

 Moran (disambiguation)
 Morin (disambiguation)
 Moron (disambiguation)
 More (disambiguation)